To be distinguished from the Russian film director (Zinovy Levovich Feldman ru) (1919—1989)
Zinovii Petrovich Feldman also Zinovy, and in German sources Sinowi (Фельдман Зиновий Петрович. 1893, Berdychiv – 1942) was a Soviet composer. He was a member of the Moscow Society for Jewish Music and composed various pieces of chamber music. He was a friend of, and influenced by Alexander Krein. Prokofiev regarded Feldman highly, and entrusted him with the orchestration of some of his works. Feldman died during the Second World War at the age of 49.

References

1893 births
1942 deaths
People from Berdychiv
People from Berdichevsky Uyezd
Ukrainian Jews
Soviet Jews
Soviet classical composers
Soviet male classical composers
Jewish classical composers
20th-century classical composers
20th-century male musicians
Soviet civilians killed in World War II